Adarsh Shiksha Niketan Senior Secondary School (ASN Sr Sec School) is a school in New Delhi, India. The school is run by Sanatan Dharm Adarsh Shiksha Sansthan, a government-registered educational society, and is affiliated with C.B.S.E.. It is a co-educational, English-medium school with pre-primary, primary, middle, and senior wings from classes Nursery to XII.

The school was established in 1975 in Jwala Nagar by Mr. K. L. Luthra. He later started another school with the same name in Mayur Vihar Ph-1, near NOIDA.

The school won the 2013-2016 British Council Best School Award.

References

External links
 ASN Senior Secondary School website

Schools in East Delhi
Educational institutions established in 1975
1975 establishments in Delhi